The Federal Correctional Institution, Texarkana (FCI Texarkana) is a low-security United States federal prison for male inmates in unincorporated Bowie County, Texas. It is operated by the Federal Bureau of Prisons, a division of the United States Department of Justice. The facility also has an adjacent satellite prison camp for minimum-security male offenders.

FCI Texarkana is located in northeast Texas near the Arkansas border, 70 miles north of Shreveport, Louisiana, and 175 miles east of Dallas, Texas.

Notable incidents
In early 2012, Keith Judd, a FCI Texarkana inmate serving a 17-year sentence for extortion, filed papers to run for president in the 2012 general election, and attained ballot status in the West Virginia Democratic primary. On May 8, 2012, Judd won 41% of the primary vote in West Virginia against incumbent Barack Obama, a higher percentage of the vote in one state than any other primary opponent of Obama had hitherto achieved in 2012 (a figure later surpassed by John Wolfe Jr.'s showing in the Arkansas primary).  While this showing would normally have entitled Judd to delegates at the 2012 Democratic National Convention, state officials expressed some uncertainty as to whether Judd had completed the required formalities, such as filing a slate of delegates and completing paperwork. Judd, who has not qualified for any other primary ballots, is contesting the ballot count, alleging that ballot workers suppressed the actual total (which he says shows him in the lead) in an effort to cover up an Obama loss.

Notable inmates (current and former) 
†Inmates who were released from custody prior to 1982 are not listed on the Bureau of Prisons website.

See also

List of U.S. federal prisons
Federal Bureau of Prisons
Incarceration in the United States

References

External links
 FCI Texarkana - Federal Bureau of Prisons

Buildings of the United States government in Texas
Texarkana
Texarkana
Texarkana, Texas
Buildings and structures in Bowie County, Texas